Secrest Ferry Bridge is a historic Pennsylvania through truss bridge located in Bean Blossom Township, Monroe County, Indiana and Wayne Township, Owen County, Indiana.  It was built by the Lafayette Engineering Co. and Vincennes Bridge Co. in 1903.  It is a single-span bridge of 316 feet in length and spans the West Fork of the White River.

It was listed on the National Register of Historic Places in 1996.

References

Road bridges on the National Register of Historic Places in Indiana
Bridges completed in 1903
Transportation buildings and structures in Monroe County, Indiana
National Register of Historic Places in Monroe County, Indiana
Transportation buildings and structures in Owen County, Indiana
National Register of Historic Places in Owen County, Indiana
Pennsylvania truss bridges in the United States